Ek Hasina Thi (transl: "There was a beautiful woman") is a Hindi crime thriller television series created by Cinevistaas Limited. It aired from 14 April 2014 to 20 December 2014 on Star Plus. Produced by Prem Krishen, the series starred Sanjeeda Sheikh, Vatsal Sheth and Simone Singh.

Plot 

Durga Thakur is wealthy and beautiful. She encounters the Goenka family whose youngest son Shaurya, is a spoiled brat and playboy artist.

Shaurya is attracted to Durga which later turns into much more when his friends challenge him. He wants to win Durga for a bet he made with his friends. Shaurya's cunning parents Sakshi and Rajnath support him, no matter what he does.

Shaurya and Durga begin to date. Sakshi notices that Shaurya is coming under Durga's influence. Shaurya's reputation becomes tainted and Sakshi suspects Durga's hand in it.

Indeed, it is revealed that Durga is actually Nitya Mitra, a girl who wants to avenge her sister, Payal Mitra. Her sister was a mental patient whom Shaurya and his friends raped two years ago. She wanted to get justice for Payal, but Sakshi and Rajnath bribed all the witnesses, so Nitya lost the case. This had made Payal go mad and her parents commit suicide.

Nitya still did not give up and threatened Goenkas that she will make them pay for what they did. The Goenkas got scared and tried to kill Nitya in an accident in which she suffered major facial injuries and needed to immediate surgical reconstruction. Dr. Dayal Thakur found her, and with the help of a surgery that would change her face, he gave her the face of his deceased daughter Durga.

Now Nitya is back as Durga and wants to get revenge on the Goenka family. She starts to destroy everyone who had made her suffer. However, her problems increase when Shaurya's elder cousin Dev returns from America, who was Nitya's best friend and secretly loved her.

Dev wants to find out about Nitya's whereabouts and what happened to her while he had gone, this worries Nitya as she does not want her real identity to get revealed, Nitya realises Dev loves her and she loves him too, but she pretends to love Shaurya and decides to marry him to enter the Goenka house and destroy them.

As Shaurya does not really love Durga nor want to marry her, and only wants to win the bet, he takes her on a trip but she had already planned what to do. She made her spy, Akash, hire some goons who terribly attacked Shaurya, leaving him paralysed under the waist. 

Sakshi doubts Durga and manipulate Shaurya through his friend, Karan not to marry Durga on the day of his and Durga's wedding, which he does. 

In order to pave Durga's path in Goenka house, Dayal coerce Dev to marry her (fake wedding) telling Dev that he would bring Nitya to Dev whilst faking a heart attack.

Rajnath impersonates Akram "Akash" Khan, Sakshi's step-son, to get the video tape which reveals that he shot his brother Arnav (Dev's father) through which Sakshi blackmailed Rajnath to marry her, killing her husband, Rehmat Khan who was the only witness of the incident, to clear all the obstacles. Sakshi learns that Rajnath and her best friend, Raima Maheshwari have an affair.

Sakshi confronts and shoots Raima in which she lapses into a coma, Dev is framed for this, because of Raima testifying against her in the court, she bribes a nurse to change her medicines worsening her health. Durga tries to prove Dev innocent.

Eventually Dev gets acquitted from the case and finds out about Durga's real identity but hides this from her waiting for her to tell him herself. Shaurya learns that Dayal was involved in his paralysis attack and shoots him causing his death, provoking Durga to get revenge for Dayal's death and tries to create rift between the Goenka family, but it goes unsuccessful.

Sakshi wants to kidnap Payal to reach Nitya, Rishi kidnaps her, when Durga learns this, she tells Dev and Akram about it. Akram gets Payal but Dev reaches the wrong place where Shaurya tries to kill him. Durga comes in between but is not harmed as the bullet only touched her. Hospitalised, Dev tells her that he knows that she is Nitya and professes his love for her.

Adamant to get revenge on Shaurya, Sakshi and Rajnath, Durga is told by the doctor about her clot on forehead, and she might be saved after performing an operation. She tells the doctor not to tell anyone about this and the fact that she has only 3–4 days left to live. Sakshi fakes Shaurya's death in an accident. Shaurya tracks down Payal, and attacks Akash and Rishi. However They survive as they were wearing bulletproof vests.

Having strong evidence against the Goenka's, Durga reveals her true identity on TV and gets them arrested, and the judge convicts Shaurya and his parents. 

Nitya becomes unconscious once the verdict is reached outside of the courtroom and Dev takes her to the hospital to have her operation done. The operation is successful, and Nitya accepts Dev and express her love for him. They reunite with Payal, Kangana (Shaurya's sister) Suchitra (Dev's mother) and Akash. 

At the end, Durga and Dev are renewing their vows in front of Kangana, Payal, Suchitra and Akashi. Upon the end, Durga gets a phone call in which she hears Shaurya whistling, hinting that Shaurya is out of prison or was never in it. The show ends on a cliffhanger, leaving the viewers wondering if a season 2 will be made to confirm whether Shaurya is actually out of prison or not.

Cast 
 Sanjeeda Sheikh as Nitya Mitra Goenka (after plastic surgery) / Durga Thakur Goenka – Mansi's elder daughter; Dayal's adoptive daughter; Payal's sister; Shaurya's ex-fiancée; Dev's best friend turned wife.
 Aditi Sajwan as Nitya Mitra (before plastic surgery) - Mansi’s elder daughter; Payal's sister; Dev's best friend
 Vatsal Sheth as Shaurya Goenka – Sakshi and Rajnath's son; Kangana's brother; Dev's evil cousin; Nitya's ex-fiancé.
 Simone Singh as Sakshi Goenka – Rehmat's ex-wife; Rajnath's wife; Shaurya and Kangana's mother.
 Ayub Khan as Rajnath Goenka – Arnav's brother; Sakshi's husband; Shaurya and Kangana's father.
 Bhuvnesh Mann as Dev Goenka – Suchitra and Arnav's son; Shaurya and Kangana's cousin; Nitya's best friend turned husband.
 Kamalika Guha Thakurta Mansi Mitra – Nitya's and Payal's mother.
 Teena Chopra as Payal Mitra – Mansi's younger daughter; Dayal's adoptive daughter; Nitya's sister. 
 Kishwer Merchant as Raima Maheshwari – Sakshi's best friend.
 Jyoti Gauba as Suchitra Goenka – Arnav's widow; Dev's mother. She is a kind-hearted person and believes in social work.
 Poonampreet Bhatia as Kangana Goenka – Sakshi and Rajnath's daughter; Shaurya's sister.
 Mihir Mishra as Akram Khan – Rehmat's son; Sakshi's step-son.
 Vicky Arora as Karan Basu – Girish's son; Shaurya's best friend and culprit of Payal 
 Ravjeet Singh / Vikram Singh Chauhan as Rishi Zaveri – Shaurya's former friend turned into enemy due to Payals protection. 
 Aliraza Namdar as Girish Basu – Karan's father.
 Bhupinder Singh as Dr. Dayal Thakur – Durga's father; Nitya's and Payal's adoptive father.
 Amit Behl as Navin Mathur – Goenkas' former employee.
 Aamir Ali as Dr. Neil Bhattacharya – Durga's fake groom.
 Vicky Arora as Karan Basu – Shaurya's friend. 
 Shalmalee Desai as Sagarika Ganguly

Cameo
 Allu Sirish to promote Kotha Janta
 Sohail Khan to promote Jai Ho

Production
The show is set in Kolkata, but is filmed in Mumbai. The series was titled while in pre-production as Daag but title Ek Hasina Thi was finalized.

The series production began in 2013 and was supposed to go on air in the same year but was delayed and premiered on 14 April 2014.

Reception

Critics

Mid-Day stated, "Ek Hasina Thi had a great start. However, despite a good plotline, impressive star cast (Simone Singh, Ayub Khan and Sanjeeda Shaikh and Vatsal Seth) and many awards, it failed to keep up with the initial pace and lost out on viewers."

The Indian Express stated the series to be more convincing and said, "The USP of the show is the fast-paced, gripping storyline and the immensely-talented star cast. But the characters seem edgy most of the time which doesn’t look very convincing and the performance of the lead actors is not standing out as yet. The most interesting and powerful performance is by Simone Singh. Her attitude and elegance comes across distinctly in her character of Sakshi Goenka. Like Singh’s, Ayub Khan's role too is well-sketched and projected with ease. The show is well-scripted and has the ability to make a mark but the fact remains that the lead actors will have to put in a lot of effort to make their characters look convincing and believable. The settings, makeup and clothes are the main highlights and strong base of the show."

Daily News and Analysis rated two and half stars and praised, "The storyline is gripping, fast-paced and slick. It's nice to see a bunch of good looking actors together. The setting in Kolkata, the ambience, the bungalows, the visuals etc speak of high production values. The serial, in short, is easy on the eye." On the other hand, they also said, "All the characters seem to be on edge, which is annoying. Nobody seems to be what they are. More importantly, whether the serial works or not is completely dependent on the actors' performances, especially since it's not a linear story. And so far, they are falling short." Speaking on cast performance they said, Beautiful and sophisticated Simone plays the shrewd and manipulative Sakshi Goenka with elan. Sanjeeda's character is layered, but it's not coming through in her performance. Even Vatsal lacks the edginess both in terms of looks and performance."

Deccan Chronicle criticised, "It’s a tried and tested plot but one that still holds a lot of potential. But the problem here is that there is no thrill in this thriller. Ek Hasina Thi follows the silly, repetitive style of saas-bahu (mother in law-daughter in law) serials, and every teeny-weeny thing gets dragged for a week, making the eventual revenge very tiresome."

Audience
The series was well received among audience. It had constantly ranked  among  top 10 in TRP chart. Last episode of the series was earned highest trp on its slot.

Recreation 
In June 2021, it was released on Hotstar on which its name was Daav.The series was only of 16 episodes while the real series had 216 episodes.

Adaptations
It was dubbed into various national and international languages including in Tamil and Telugu as "Durga", in Malayalam as "Oru shishirathinte ormakku" and in Arabic as "Laheeb Al-Huqd / لهيب الحقد"  ( "Flames of Hatred") on MBC Bollywood. It was also dubbed into Sinhalese as "Sulanga Wage Awidin" on Hiru TV.

Awards

Indian Telly Awards 2014
 Best Actress in a Negative Role - Simone Singh
Indian Television Academy Awards 2014
 Best Series - Drama - Ek Hasina Thi
 Best Actor in a Negative Role - Ayub Khan
 Best Actress in a Negative Role - Simone Singh
 Gr8! Performer of the Year (Female) - Sanjeeda Sheikh
 Nominated for Best Actor (Male) - Vatsal Sheth

Footnotes

References

External links
 Official Website on hotstar

2014 Indian television series debuts
StarPlus original programming
Television shows set in Kolkata
Indian television soap operas
2014 Indian television series endings